Love Has a Name may refer to:
 Love Has a Name (Jesus Culture album), 2017
 Love Has a Name (Kathy Troccoli album), 2000